Saurabh Bahuguna is an Indian politician from Uttarakhand and a Member of the Uttarakhand Legislative Assembly. He is currently serving as the Minister of Animal Husbandry, Fisheries, Skill development & Employment, Protocol and Sugarcane Development in the Pushkar Singh Dhami's cabinet of 2022. He represents the Sitarganj (Uttarakhand Assembly constituency). Saurabh is a member of the Bharatiya Janata Party. He is the youngest son of former Chief Minister of Uttarakhand Vijay Bahuguna. He is the grandson of former Union Cabinet Minister & former Chief Minister of Uttar Pradesh Hemwati Nandan Bahuguna.

Positions held

References 

Living people
Uttarakhand MLAs 2022–2027
Uttarakhand MLAs 2017–2022
Year of birth missing (living people)
Bharatiya Janata Party politicians from Uttarakhand
People from Tehri Garhwal district